The 1937–38 New York Rangers season was the franchise's 12th season. New York finished second in the American Division in regular season with a record of 27–15–6, and qualified for the playoffs. In the league semi-finals, the Rangers lost to the New York Americans 2–1 in a best of three games series.

Offseason
The team played an exhibition game against the New York Americans in Saskatoon, Saskatchewan 30 October to open the new Saskatoon Arena.

Regular season

Final standings

Record vs. opponents

Schedule and results

|-  style="text-align:center; background:#cfc;"
| 1 || 7 || @ Detroit Red Wings || 3–0 || 1–0–0
|-  style="text-align:center; background:#fbb;"
| 2 || 11 || Chicago Black Hawks || 3–1 || 1–1–0
|-  style="text-align:center; background:#fbb;"
| 3 || 14 || @ Boston Bruins || 3–2 || 1–2–0
|-  style="text-align:center; background:#cfc;"
| 4 || 16 || New York Americans || 1–0 || 2–2–0
|-  style="text-align:center; background:#cfc;"
| 5 || 20 || @ Montreal Maroons || 3–0 || 3–2–0
|-  style="text-align:center; background:white;"
| 6 || 21 || Montreal Maroons || 3 – 3 OT || 3–2–1
|-  style="text-align:center; background:#fbb;"
| 7 || 25 || Toronto Maple Leafs || 3–1 || 3–3–1
|-  style="text-align:center; background:#fbb;"
| 8 || 27 || @ Montreal Canadiens || 2–1 || 3–4–1
|-

|-  style="text-align:center; background:#fbb;"
| 9 || 2 || @ Chicago Black Hawks || 2–1 || 3–5–1
|-  style="text-align:center; background:#cfc;"
| 10 || 5 || Boston Bruins || 4–0 || 4–5–1
|-  style="text-align:center; background:#cfc;"
| 11 || 11 || @ Toronto Maple Leafs || 6–3 || 5–5–1
|-  style="text-align:center; background:#cfc;"
| 12 || 12 || @ Detroit Red Wings || 5–2 || 6–5–1
|-  style="text-align:center; background:#cfc;"
| 13 || 14 || Detroit Red Wings || 3–1 || 7–5–1
|-  style="text-align:center; background:#cfc;"
| 14 || 16 || @ New York Americans || 2–0 || 8–5–1
|-  style="text-align:center; background:white;"
| 15 || 19 || Montreal Canadiens || 2 – 2 OT || 8–5–2
|-  style="text-align:center; background:#cfc;"
| 16 || 23 || @ Montreal Maroons || 4–0 || 9–5–2
|-  style="text-align:center; background:#fbb;"
| 17 || 26 || Chicago Black Hawks || 3–1 || 9–6–2
|-  style="text-align:center; background:#fbb;"
| 18 || 28 || @ Boston Bruins || 3–2 || 9–7–2
|-  style="text-align:center; background:#cfc;"
| 19 || 31 || Boston Bruins || 5–3 || 10–7–2
|-

|-  style="text-align:center; background:white;"
| 20 || 4 || New York Americans || 5 – 5 OT || 10–7–3
|-  style="text-align:center; background:#cfc;"
| 21 || 6 || @ Chicago Black Hawks || 4–1 || 11–7–3
|-  style="text-align:center; background:#fbb;"
| 22 || 8 || @ Toronto Maple Leafs || 3–2 || 11–8–3
|-  style="text-align:center; background:#cfc;"
| 23 || 9 || Detroit Red Wings || 4–1 || 12–8–3
|-  style="text-align:center; background:white;"
| 24 || 13 || Detroit Red Wings || 3 – 3 OT || 12–8–4
|-  style="text-align:center; background:#cfc;"
| 25 || 16 || @ New York Americans || 4–0 || 13–8–4
|-  style="text-align:center; background:#cfc;"
| 26 || 18 || Montreal Canadiens || 3 – 1 OT || 14–8–4
|-  style="text-align:center; background:#cfc;"
| 27 || 23 || Montreal Maroons || 8–2 || 15–8–4
|-  style="text-align:center; background:#cfc;"
| 28 || 25 || @ Boston Bruins || 3–2 || 16–8–4
|-  style="text-align:center; background:#fbb;"
| 29 || 27 || @ Montreal Canadiens || 4–2 || 16–9–4
|-  style="text-align:center; background:white;"
| 30 || 30 || @ Chicago Black Hawks || 2 – 2 OT || 16–9–5
|-

|-  style="text-align:center; background:#cfc;"
| 31 || 1 || Chicago Black Hawks || 6–1 || 17–9–5
|-  style="text-align:center; background:#cfc;"
| 32 || 6 || Toronto Maple Leafs || 2–1 || 18–9–5
|-  style="text-align:center; background:#cfc;"
| 33 || 10 || @ Detroit Red Wings || 4–0 || 19–9–5
|-  style="text-align:center; background:#cfc;"
| 34 || 12 || @ Montreal Maroons || 5–3 || 20–9–5
|-  style="text-align:center; background:#cfc;"
| 35 || 13 || Montreal Maroons || 4–1 || 21–9–5
|-  style="text-align:center; background:#fbb;"
| 36 || 17 || Boston Bruins || 3 – 2 OT || 21–10–5
|-  style="text-align:center; background:#fbb;"
| 37 || 20 || @ Boston Bruins || 3 – 2 OT || 21–11–5
|-  style="text-align:center; background:#fbb;"
| 38 || 22 || Montreal Canadiens || 2–1 || 21–12–5
|-  style="text-align:center; background:#cfc;"
| 39 || 24 || Chicago Black Hawks || 6–3 || 22–12–5
|-  style="text-align:center; background:#cfc;"
| 40 || 26 || @ Toronto Maple Leafs || 4–2 || 23–12–5
|-  style="text-align:center; background:#cfc;"
| 41 || 27 || @ Chicago Black Hawks || 4–1 || 24–12–5
|-

|-  style="text-align:center; background:#cfc;"
| 42 || 3 || Detroit Red Wings || 4–3 || 25–12–5
|-  style="text-align:center; background:#fbb;"
| 43 || 6 || @ New York Americans || 3–1 || 25–13–5
|-  style="text-align:center; background:#cfc;"
| 44 || 8 || Toronto Maple Leafs || 4–3 || 26–13–5
|-  style="text-align:center; background:#fbb;"
| 45 || 13 || Boston Bruins || 2–1 || 26–14–5
|-  style="text-align:center; background:#cfc;"
| 46 || 17 || New York Americans || 5–3 || 27–14–5
|-  style="text-align:center; background:white;"
| 47 || 19 || @ Montreal Canadiens || 1 – 1 OT || 27–14–6
|-  style="text-align:center; background:#fbb;"
| 48 || 20 || @ Detroit Red Wings || 4–3 || 27–15–6
|-

Playoffs

Key:  Win  Loss

Player statistics
Skaters

Goaltenders

†Denotes player spent time with another team before joining Rangers. Stats reflect time with Rangers only.
‡Traded mid-season. Stats reflect time with Rangers only.

Awards and records

Transactions

See also
1937–38 NHL season

References

External links
 

New York Rangers seasons
New York Rangers
New York Rangers
New York Rangers
New York Rangers
Madison Square Garden
1930s in Manhattan